North Carolina Highway 216 (NC 216) is a primary state highway in the U.S. state of North Carolina.  The highway runs north–south, from the South Carolina state line to NC 274 near the unincorporated community of Tryon.

Route description
NC 216 is a  two-lane rural highway that begins at the South Carolina state line,  from Kings Mountain National Military Park; the road continues south towards the park as South Carolina Highway 216 (SC 216). Going north, it crosses over Interstate 85 then has a short overlap with U.S. Route 29 (US 29). It enters the city of Kings Mountain on Battleground Avenue.  Through Kings Mountain, it crosses US 74 continuing north on Piedmont Avenue.  The road then becomes County Line Road, as they highway straddles the county line between Cleveland and Gaston counties.  The highway ends at NC 274.

History
NC 216 was established in 1930 as a new primary route from US 29/NC 205 to the South Carolina state line. It then continued north on several upgraded secondary roads to its current terminus on NC 274. In the early 1960s, SC 216 was established as a continuation of NC 216 to Kings Mountain National Military Park.

Junction list

References

216
Transportation in Cleveland County, North Carolina
Transportation in Gaston County, North Carolina